FC Stroitel Morshansk was a Russian football team from Morshansk. It played professionally from 1996 to 1998. Their best result was 20th place in the Zone Centre of the Russian Second Division in 1998.

External links
  Team history at KLISF

Association football clubs established in 1995
Association football clubs disestablished in 2003
Defunct football clubs in Russia
Sport in Tambov Oblast
1995 establishments in Russia
2003 disestablishments in Russia